New Jalpaiguri–Amritsar Karmabhoomi Express is a Express train of the Indian Railways connecting the cities of Amritsar in Punjab and Siliguri in West Bengal. It is currently being operated with 12407/12408 train numbers on a weekly basis.

Service

The 12407/New Jalpaiguri–Amritsar Karmabhoomi Express has an average speed of 55 km/hr and covers 1825 km in 33 hrs 20 mins. 12408/Amritsar–New Jalpaiguri Karmabhoomi Express has an average speed of 55 km/hr and covers 1825 km in 33 hrs 20 mins.

Route and halts 

The important halts of the train are:

WEST BENGAL
  (Starts)

BIHAR
 
 
 
 
 
 
 

UTTAR PRADESH
 
 
 
 
 

HARYANA
 

PUNJAB
 
 
 
  (Ends)

Coach composition

The train has standard LHB rakes with max speed of 130 kmph. The train consists of 16 coaches:

 14 General
 2 Generator Luggage/parcel van

Traction

Both trains are hauled by a Tughlakabad Electric Loco Shed-based WAP-7 electric locomotive from New Jalpaiguri to Amritsar and vice versa.

See also 

New Jalpaiguri  Junction railway station
Amritsar Junction railway station
Chennai–New Jalpaiguri Superfast Express
New Jalpaiguri–Howrah Shatabdi Express
New Jalpaiguri-Digha Paharia Express
Howrah–New Jalpaiguri AC Express
New Jalpaiguri–New Delhi Superfast Express
 Sealdah-New Jalpaiguri Superfast Darjeeling Mail
 Sealdah-New Jalpaiguri Padatik Superfast Express
 New Jalpaiguri–Sitamarhi Weekly Express

Notes

External links 

 12407/New Jalpaiguri - Amritsar Karmabhoomi Express India Rail Info
 12408/Amritsar - New Jalpaiguri Karmabhoomi Express India Rail Info

References 

Transport in Siliguri
Transport in Jalpaiguri
Transport in Amritsar
Named passenger trains of India
Rail transport in West Bengal
Rail transport in Bihar
Rail transport in Uttar Pradesh
Rail transport in Haryana
Rail transport in Punjab, India